Volnaya Artyomovka is a rural locality (a village) in Muromtsevskoye Rural Settlement, Sudogodsky District, Vladimir Oblast, Russia. The population was 199 as of 2010. There are 4 streets.

Geography 
Volnaya Artyomovka is located on the Poboyka River, 15 km south of Sudogda (the district's administrative centre) by road. Daniltsevo is the nearest rural locality.

References 

Rural localities in Sudogodsky District